The 1938 Vanderbilt Commodores football team represented Vanderbilt University during the 1938 college football season. The Commodores were led by Ray Morrison, who served in the fourth season of his second stint, and fifth overall, as head coach. Member of the Southeastern Conference, Vanderbilt went 6–3 overall and 4–3 in conference play.  The Commodores played their five home games at Dudley Field in Nashville, Tennessee.

Schedule

References

Vanderbilt
Vanderbilt Commodores football seasons
Vanderbilt Commodores football